Turnabout Island may refer to one of the following locations:

 Turnabout Island in Alaska (USGS information) 
 Turnabout Island (Antarctica) in the Saffery Islands
 Niushan Dao in the Taiwan Strait